Joe Pilkington (1940 – 7 July 1999) was an Irish actor, best known for his portrayal of Eamon Maher in the long-running TV series The Riordans. Father of actress Rachel Pilkington, Joseph Pilkington made a marked contribution to Irish arts and culture through roles played both on and offscreen. His acting roles in the late 1960s in the Abbey Theatre are listed.

Filmography

Film
Underground (1970) as Enlisted Man
The McKenzie Break (1970) as Police Communications Sergeant (uncredited)
The Outsider (1979)
Light Years Away (1981) as Thomas
Traveller (1981) as Traveller man
The Ballroom of Romance (1986) as Tim Daly
Into The West (1992) as Detective
A Man of no Importance (1994) as Ernie Lally
The Butcher Boy (1998) as Charlie McGlone

Television
The Riordans (1972–1979) as Eamon Maher
The Hanging Gale (1995) as James Phelan

References

Further reading 
galway-actor-forever-linked-to-riordans

External links
 

1940 births
1999 deaths
Irish male film actors
Irish male stage actors
Irish male television actors
Irish male soap opera actors
20th-century Irish male actors
Male actors from Galway (city)